Make Some Noise is the third studio album by the Australian–American hard rock band The Dead Daisies. It was released on August 9, 2016, by Spitfire Music.

Track listing
Songwriting credits via disc booklet: all tracks written by Doug Aldrich, John Corabi, Marti Frederiksen, David Lowy, Marco Mendoza and Brian Tichy unless otherwise noted.

Personnel
Credits are adapted from disc booklet.

Doug Aldrich – guitar
John Corabi – vocals, acoustic guitar
David Lowy – guitar
Marco Mendoza - bass, backing vocals
Brian Tichy – drums

Additional personnel
Marti Frederiksen – backing vocals, production
Suzie McNeil – harmonica, backing vocals

Production 
Anthony Focx – mixing
Ross Hogarth – engineering
Kyle Richards, Dave Latto – assistant engineering
Kari Smith – production coordinator
Howie Weinberg – mastering
Gentry Studer – assistant mastering
Freimauer.com – art direction, graphic design
Oliver Halfin, Katarina Benzova – photography
David Edwards – management

Chart performance

References

2016 albums
The Dead Daisies albums
Albums produced by Marti Frederiksen